Forrest Melvill Thomas Jr. (April 21, 1953 – September 9, 2013), known professionally as Forrest, was an American singer, based in the Netherlands.

Life and career
Born in Galveston, Texas, where he sang in church during childhood, he moved to Los Angeles, California as a teen and won several contests there as a singer. After this stage in his career, he moved to the Netherlands, where he had a hit in 1983 with the song "Rock the Boat", a cover of the Hues Corporation's 1974 No. 1 US hit. His version peaked at No. 4 in the UK Singles Chart and in his native United States (No. 9 Hot Dance Club Play).

A second single, "Feel the Need in Me" (originally by the Detroit Emeralds), was a hit in the UK, reaching No. 17. A third single, "One Lover (Don't Stop The Show)", peaked at No. 67 in the UK.

He and his wife, a television presenter had two sons, but later separated, after which he began to concentrate again on music. He sang in R.E.S.P.E.C.T., a theatre show, in 2001, dedicated to 1960s soul music. He was asked by DJ Roog to front the band Planet Hardsoul, who had a minor hit with their cover of "Where Did Our Love Go".
In December 2012, Thomas married again, to Diana van Lippen.

Death
On September 9, 2013, Forrest died of a stroke in a hospital in Tilburg, Netherlands, aged 60.

Discography

Albums
 One Lover (Ariola Records, 1983)

Singles

References

External links
 

1953 births
2013 deaths
20th-century African-American male singers
American emigrants to the Netherlands
American dance musicians
American male pop singers
Dutch pop singers
Musicians from Los Angeles
Singers from Texas
People from Galveston, Texas
Singers from California
21st-century African-American people
Ariola Records artists